Chick is a 1936 British comedy crime film directed by Michael Hankinson and starring Sydney Howard, Betty Ann Davies and Fred Conyngham. It is based on the 1923 novel of the same title by Edgar Wallace, which had previously been made into a 1928 silent film. The film was made at Elstree Studios. The hall porter at an Oxbridge College inherits an Earldom and enjoys a series of adventures.

Cast
Sydney Howard as Chick Beane 
Betty Ann Davies as Peggy 
Fred Conyngham as  Sir Anthony Monsard  
Cecil Humphreys as Sturgis  
Mae Bacon as Gert  
Wallace Geoffrey as Latimer  
Aubrey Mather as The Dean  
Arthur Chesney as Lord Frensham 
Edmund D'Alby as Rennie  
Robert Nainby as Mr. Beane  
Merle Tottenham as Maid  
Aubrey Fitzgerald as Banks  
Fred Rains as Warden  
Eric Micklewood as Undergraduate  
Joe Monkhouse as Mason  
Richard Morris as Clerk 
Aubrey Pollock as Lawyer

References

Bibliography
Low, Rachael. Filmmaking in 1930s Britain. George Allen & Unwin, 1985. .

External links

British crime comedy films
British black-and-white films
1930s crime comedy films
Films directed by Michael Hankinson
Films shot at Station Road Studios, Elstree
Films set in England
Films based on British novels
Films based on works by Edgar Wallace
Remakes of British films
Sound film remakes of silent films
British and Dominions Studios films
1936 comedy films
Films scored by Percival Mackey
1930s British films
1930s English-language films